Yunnanilus chui is a species of ray-finned fish, a stone loach, in the genus Yunnanilus. The specific name honours the ichthyologist Chu Xin-Luo. The type locality for this species is Fuxian Lake at Haikou, Hainan in China.

References

C
Taxa named by Yang Jun-Xing
Fish described in 1991